An omnium (from Latin Omni: of all, belonging to all) is a multiple race event in track cycling. Historically the omnium has had a variety of formats.  In recent years, road racing has also adopted the term to describe multi-day races that feature the three primary road race events (time trial, mass start and criterium).

History
The omnium was re-introduced into the World Championships as a five race track cycling format for men in 2007 and for women in 2009. The omnium was changed in 2010 by the UCI to include the elimination race and the distances of the events were lengthened to favour endurance cyclists.

The omnium replaced the individual pursuit, the points race at the Summer Olympic Games beginning in 2012. The change received some criticism from cyclist Rebecca Romero, who was left unable to defend her Olympic title.

Current omnium

From June 2014 until the end of 2016, the omnium as defined by the Union Cycliste Internationale (UCI) consisted of the following six events held over 2 days:

 Scratch race
 Individual pursuit
 4,000 metres for elite men, 3,000 metres for junior men and elite women, and 2,000 metres for junior women
 Elimination race
 Time trial
 1 km men, 500 metres women
 Flying lap (against the clock)
 Points race
 40 km for elite men, 25 km for elite women, 25 km for junior men, 20 km for junior women

For the first five events, each winner was awarded 40 points, each second place 38 points, each third place 36, etc.  Riders ranked 21st and below will each be awarded 1 point.
In the Points Race, riders add to and lose points from their totals based on laps gained and lost, and points won in sprints.

After the 2016 season, the three timed events – the sprint time trial, flying lap and individual pursuit were all removed from the event, a tempo race added, and the event shortened to a  single day. The points race as final race format remains with minor modifications.

 Scratch race
 10 km for elite men, 7.5 km for elite women and junior men, 5 km for junior women
 Tempo race
 10 km for elite men, 7.5 km for elite women and junior men, 5 km for junior women
 Elimination race
 2 laps per sprint on 250 m tracks
 Points race
 25 km for elite men, 20 km for elite women and junior men, 15 km for junior women

The winner of the Omnium is the rider who has obtained the highest total of points. In the event of a tie in the final ranking, the places in the final sprint of the last event, the Points Race breaks the tie.

A rider must have completed every event in the omnium, otherwise they are ranked last.

Road racing omnium
A road race omnium consists of a time trial, a criterium, and a mass-start road race – typically held across a weekend or other 2-3 day period.  Points are awarded to the top finishers at each event and totalled at the end of the event.  The overall winner for the event is chosen based on the number of accumulated points.  Often, organisers will stipulate that riders must complete each event in order to qualify for the overall prize.

References

External links

 Omnium introduced by Cyclingnews.com
 UCI wants Sixth Event in Olympic Omnium

 
Events in track cycling
Combination events